The Houses of Montlhéry and Le Puiset (referred to as the Montlhéry Clan by Riley-Smith) is the name given by two powerful families, joined in marriage, that played a major role in the 11th and 12th centuries in both the Crusades as well as the administration of the Holy Land.  The Montlhéry branch consists of the relatives (descendants and in-laws) of Guy I of Montlhéry (referred to here as simply Guy) and Hodierna of Gometz.  The Le Puiset branch consists of the descendants of Everard I of Breteuil.  Everard’s son Hugh I of Le Puiset (or simply Hugh) married Guy’s daughter Alice, bringing the families together.  Prominent members of the families are as follows.

Knights who Took the Cross (First Crusade unless otherwise noted) 
 Milo I of Montlhéry (d. 1102), son of Guy
 Guy III Trousseau (d. 1109), son of the previous
 Guy I of Dampierre (d. 1151), grandson of Milo I
 Guy II of Dampierre (d. 1216), grandson of the previous (Third Crusade)
 Hugh II Bardoul of Broyes (d. before 1121), son-in-law of Milo I
 Hugh III of Broyes (d. 1199), grandson of the previous (Second Crusade)
 Guy II the Red of Rochefort (d. 1108), son of Guy
 Hugh I of Rethel (d. 1108), son-in-law of Guy
 Guitier of Rethel (d. 1171), grandson of the previous
 Walter of Saint-Valéry (d. after 1098), son-in-law of Guy
 Bernard II of Saint-Valéry (d. unknown), son of the previous
 Eudon of Saint-Valéry (d. unknown), brother of the previous
 Éverard III (d. 1099), son of Hugh and grandson of Guy
 Hugh III of Le Puiset (d. 1132), son of the previous
 Ralph the Red of Pont-Echanfray (d. 1120 in the White Ship disaster), grandson-in-law of Hugh
 Guy of Puiset (d. 1127), son of Hugh
 Walo II of Chaumont-en-Vexin (d. 1098), son-in-law of Hugh
 Drogo de Chaumont (d. 1099), son of the previous
 Waleran of Le Puiset (d. 1126), son of Hugh
 Joscelin IV of Lèves (d. unknown), son-in-law of Hugh and father-in-law of Ralph the Red
 Héribrand III of Hierges, son-in-law of Hugh I of Rethel.

Kings of Jerusalem 
 Baldwin II (d. 1131), son of Hugh I of Rethel
 Melisende, Queen of Jerusalem (d. 1153), daughter of the previous
 Subsequent kings.

Princes of Galilee 
 William I of Bures (d. 1142), son of Hugh of Crécy, and grandson of Guy
 William II of Bures (d. 1158), brother of the previous.

Counts of Edessa 
 Joscelin I (d. 1131), grandson of Guy
 Joscelin II (d. 1159), son of the previous.

Counts of Jaffa 
 Hugh I of Jaffa (d. between 1112 and 1118), son of Hugh
 Hugh II of Jaffa (d. 1134), son of the previous.

Others 
 Gilduin of Le Puiset (d. 1135), Abbot of St. Mary of the Valley of Jehoshaphat, son of Hugh
 Cecilia of Le Bourcq, Lady of Tarsus, sister of King Baldwin II
 Manasses of Hierges, Constable of Jerusalem, grandson of Hugh I of Rethel
 Renaud of Montlhéry, Bishop of Troyes, son of Milo I
 Guy of Dampierre, Bishop of Chalon, son of Guy I of Dampierre
 Hugh de Puiset, Bishop of Durham (d. 1195), son of Hugh III of Le Puiset
 Hugh of Crécy (d. 1147), seneschal, son of Guy II the Red of Rochefort.

Related Houses 
 House of Dampierre (Guy I of Dampierre)
 House of Courtenay (Joscelin I, Lord of Courtenay, son-in-law of Guy)
 House of Dammartin (Drogo de Chaumont)
 House of Châteaudun (descendants of Melisende and her husband Fulk the Younger, King of Jerusalem).

The family trees of the Montlhéry and Le Puiset houses can be found in Riley-Smith.

Sources 
 Riley-Smith, Johathan, The First Crusaders, 1095-1131, Cambridge University Press, London, 1997
 La Monte, John L.,The Lords of Le Puiset on the Crusades, Speculum, 1942
 Runciman, Steven, A History of the Crusades, Volume I: The First Crusade and the Foundation of the Kingdom of Jerusalem, Cambridge University Press, London, 1951
 Riley-Smith, Jonathan, The Atlas of the Crusades, Facts On File, New York, 1990, pg 14

References 

Christians of the First Crusade
Crusade01